Pringlea antiscorbutica, commonly known as Kerguelen cabbage, is a flowering plant and the sole member of the monotypic genus Pringlea in the family Brassicaceae. Its common name comes from the archipelago of its discovery, the Kerguelen Islands, and its generic name derives from Sir John Pringle, president of the Royal Society at the time of its discovery by Captain James Cook's Surgeon, William Anderson in 1776.

Description 
Pringlea has leaf rosettes of up to 45 cm in diameter, that sit on top of perennial half woody stems of about 15 cm thick and up to 1 m long. The erect flowering stems remain on the plants for many years.

Distribution 
The species grows on the remote Heard Island and McDonald Islands, Crozet, Prince Edward and Kerguelen Islands. The ancestor of P. antiscorbutica probably migrated from South America some five million years ago.

Ecology
The home islands of Kerguelen cabbage are at roughly 50° south latitude and constantly buffeted by strong winds, making the islands unfavorable for wind pollination, except on infrequent mild days. This climate, plus the absence of potential insect pollinators, means the Kerguelen cabbage can only survive through a process of self-pollination.

The plants grow to a diameter of about 50 cm in around four years, and flower for the first time in their third or fourth year. At the mature stage, this species exhibits several adaptations linked to cold tolerance such as high polyamine levels. Pringlea has a very high leaf water content (above 83%) and the waterflow from the root to the leaves is very easy, which is no problem since soil water content on the distribution area of Kerguelen cabbage is permanently high. This implies that successfully growing this species elsewhere is difficult.

Uses
The plant is edible, containing high levels of potassium. Its leaves contain a vitamin C-rich oil, a fact which, in the days of sailing ships, made it very attractive to sailors suffering from scurvy, hence the species name's epithet antiscorbutica, which means "against scurvy" in Low Latin. It was essential to the diets of the whalers on Kerguelen when pork, beef, or seal meat was used up. In May 1840, botanist Joseph Dalton Hooker was the first to make a technical analysis of the plant, and to assign the Latin name.

Hooker also reported having eaten some soup that had been made with Kerguelen cabbage, and described the raw leaves as tasting like cress, the boiled leaves as tasting like "stale" cabbage, and the root as tasting like horseradish.

Conservation
The micropezid fly species Calycopteryx mosleyi is associated with this plant. Rabbits which were introduced on the Kerguelen around 1874, feed on the cabbage, and the plant is now limited to locations that cannot be accessed by them. Fortunately, rabbits are not present on all islands.

References

External links 
 

Brassicaceae
Monotypic Brassicaceae genera
Leaf vegetables
Flora of the Kerguelen Islands
Flora of Heard Island and McDonald Islands
Flora of the Prince Edward Islands
Flora of the Crozet Islands